Diniz is a Portuguese-language surname. It may refer to:

 Denis of Portugal (1261–1325), the sixth King of Portugal and the Algarve
 Abilio Diniz (born 1936), Brazilian businessman, father of Pedro
 Alex Diniz (born 1985), Brazilian cyclist
 Gabriel Diniz (1990–2019), Brazilian singer and composer
 Jacinto F. Diniz (1888–1949), American politician
 Mauro Diniz (born 1952), Brazilian cavaquinist and singer
 Paulo Diniz (1940–2022), Brazilian singer
 Paulo Roberto Diniz Jr. (fl. 1990s–2010s), Brazilian bass guitarist
 Pedro Diniz (born 1970), Brazilian racing driver, son of Abílio
 Priscillo Diniz (born 1948), Brazilian golfer
 Yohann Diniz (born 1978), French race walker

Portuguese-language surnames